Kishori Mohan Tripathi was an Indian politician and member of the Constituent Assembly of India from the Central Provinces.

Early life 
Tripathi was born on 8 November 1912 in the Sarangarh State.

Career 
Tripathi became a member of the Indian parliament in 1950 at the age of 37 and served till 1952.

Death and legacy 
Tripathi died on 25 September 1994. Kishori Mohan Tripathi Government Girls College is a college in Punjab state named after him.

Tripathi's grandson, Colonel Viplav Tripathi, was killed in action in Manipur State while serving in the Assam Rifles.

See also 
Viplav Tripathi

References 

Members of the Constituent Assembly of India
1994 deaths
1912 births
People from Sarangarh